This is a list of Canadian television related events from 1993.

Events

Debuts

Ending this year

Television shows

1950s
Country Canada (1954–2007)
Hockey Night in Canada (1952–present)
The National (1954–present).
Front Page Challenge (1957–1995)

1960s
CTV National News (1961–present)
Land and Sea (1964–present)
Man Alive (1967–2000)
Mr. Dressup (1967–1996)
The Nature of Things (1960–present, scientific documentary series)
Question Period (1967–present, news program)
W-FIVE (1966–present, newsmagazine program)

1970s
Canada AM (1972–present, news program)
the fifth estate (1975–present, newsmagazine program)
Marketplace (1972–present, newsmagazine program)
100 Huntley Street (1977–present, religious program)

1980s
Adrienne Clarkson Presents (1988–1999)
CityLine (1987–present, news program)
Fashion File (1989–2009)
Fred Penner's Place (1985–1997)
The Kids in the Hall (1989–1994)
Just For Laughs (1988–present)
Midday (1985–2000)
On the Road Again (1987–2007)
Road to Avonlea (1989–1996)
Street Legal (1987–1994)
Venture (1985–2007)

1990s
 African Skies (1991–1994)
 Are You Afraid of the Dark? (1990–1996)
 E.N.G. (1990–1994)
 Neon Rider (1990–1995)
 North of 60 (1992–1997)
 Northwood (1991–1994)
 The Red Green Show (1991–2006)
 Witness (1992–2004)

TV movies

Networks and services

Network launches

Television stations

Debuts

See also
 1993 in Canada
 List of Canadian films of 1993

References